Jock Inglis was a Scottish footballer who played in The Football League for Preston North End.

References

Scottish footballers
Preston North End F.C. players
English Football League players
1920 deaths
Year of birth missing
Association football forwards